Kripa Sadan High School is a primary and secondary school in Latur, Maharashtra, India. It was built by Fatima Sister.

High schools and secondary schools in Maharashtra
Education in Latur

| Founded : 1985
| Founder :Father Francis Xavier Kroot
|Principal :Leeda Rodriguez 
No. Of floor :3 
| Mid day service : No 
| School hour for students :5